Fred Castro is the current head coach of the Eastern Michigan University women's basketball team, a position he assumed after the end of the 2016 season. Prior to that, he spent three years as the offensive coordinator of the University of Washington women's team, under head coach Mike Neighbors.

Head coaching career
Sources:

 MAC 2017–18 Women's Basketball Standings
 MAC 2016–17 Women's Basketball Standings

References

External links
Eastern Michigan Eagles coaching bio

Year of birth missing (living people)
Living people
Albany Great Danes women's basketball coaches
Basketball coaches from Texas
Eastern Michigan Eagles women's basketball coaches
Sportspeople from Denton, Texas
Tulsa Golden Hurricane women's basketball coaches
University of Oklahoma alumni
Washington Huskies women's basketball coaches